Flight 343 may refer to:

Air France Flight 343, crashed on 29 August 1960
Aeroflot Flight 343, crashed on 29 September 1982
Wuhan Airlines Flight 343, crashed on June 22, 2000

0343